Mary Ann Arty-Majors (November 24, 1926 – October 26, 2000) was an American politician from Pennsylvania who served as a Republican member of the Pennsylvania House of Representatives for the 165th district from 1979 to 1988.

Early life and education
Arty was born in Philadelphia, Pennsylvania.  She graduated from Philadelphia High School for Girls in 1944. She received a R.N degree from the Medical College of Pennsylvania in 1947 and a B.S. from West Chester State College (now West Chester University) in 1966.

Career
Arty was elected to the Pennsylvania House of Representatives for the 165th district in 1978 and was reelected to 4 consecutive terms.  She was not a candidate for reelection in 1988.

She was elected to the Delaware County Council and served from 1989 to 1996 including as chair from 1991 to 1996.  She worked as the director of Delaware County Human Services from 1996 to 1998.

References

1926 births
2000 deaths
20th-century American politicians
20th-century American women politicians
Drexel University alumni
Republican Party members of the Pennsylvania House of Representatives
West Chester University alumni
Women state legislators in Pennsylvania
Politicians from Philadelphia